Bernie Chazen (1942 – 27 January 2009) was an American bridge player. Chazen was from Tamarac, Florida

Bridge accomplishments

Wins

 North American Bridge Championships (5)
 Rockwell Mixed Pairs (2) 1973, 2000 
 Senior Knockout Teams (1) 1999 
 Mitchell Board-a-Match Teams (1) 1971 
 Chicago Mixed Board-a-Match (1) 1984

Runners-up

 North American Bridge Championships
 Senior Knockout Teams (1) 2000 
 Spingold (2) 1984, 1987

References

External links
 

Living people
American contract bridge players
1942 births
Place of birth missing (living people)
Date of birth missing (living people)
People from Tamarac, Florida
Sportspeople from Broward County, Florida